is a passenger railway station located in the city of Ōzu, Ehime Prefecture, Japan. It is operated by JR Shikoku and has the station number "U16".

Lines
Connections with other services are needed to travel further east of Matsuyama on the line.

Layout
The station consists of two opposed side platforms serving two tracks. A small station building is unstaffed and serves only as a waiting room. Access to the opposite platform is by means of a level crossing with steps at both ends. A bike shed is provided near station. A siding branches off track 1 and ends near the station building and is used by track maintenance equipment.

History
At that time, the station was operated by Japanese Government Railways (JGR), later becoming Japanese National Railways (JNR). With the privatization of JNR on 1 April 1987, control of the station passed to JR Shikoku.

Surrounding area
Ozu Municipal Hirano Junior High School
Ozu City Hirano Elementary School

See also
 List of railway stations in Japan

References

External links
Station timetable

Railway stations in Ehime Prefecture
Railway stations in Japan opened in 1936
Ōzu, Ehime